"Do You Believe" is a charity single by Julie-Anne Dineen that was released in March 2009 reaching number 1 on the Irish Singles Chart staying top for 1 week. The song was written by Philip Scanlon. The proceeds of the single went to the Symptomatic Breast Cancer unit at the Mid-Western Regional Hospital in Ireland, where Dineen had just finished treatment for breast cancer. She has just completed a tour of Limerick schools where she performed her chart topping song and spreading a cancer aware message. She followed her chart success with a Top 3 hit in Ireland, a cover of "River Deep – Mountain High" released in October 2009.

Charts

See also
List of number-one singles of 2009 (Ireland)

References

2009 singles
Irish Singles Chart number-one singles
2009 songs
Charity singles
County Limerick